Clostridium botulinum is a Gram-positive, rod-shaped, anaerobic, spore-forming, motile bacterium with the ability to produce the neurotoxin botulinum.

The botulinum toxin can cause botulism, a severe flaccid paralytic disease in humans and other animals, and is the most potent toxin known to mankind, natural or synthetic, with a lethal dose of 1.3–2.1 ng/kg in humans.

C. botulinum is a diverse group of pathogenic bacteria initially grouped together by their ability to produce botulinum toxin and now known as four distinct groups, C. botulinum groups I–IV, as well as some strains of Clostridium butyricum and Clostridium baratii, are the bacteria responsible for producing botulinum toxin.

C. botulinum is responsible for foodborne botulism (ingestion of preformed toxin), infant botulism (intestinal infection with toxin-forming C. botulinum), and wound botulism (infection of a wound with C. botulinum).  C. botulinum produces heat-resistant endospores that are commonly found in soil and are able to survive under adverse conditions.

C. botulinum is commonly associated with bulging canned food; bulging, misshapen cans can be due to an internal increase in pressure caused by gas produced by bacteria.

Microbiology

C. botulinum is a Gram-positive, rod-shaped, spore-forming bacterium.  It is an obligate anaerobe, meaning that oxygen is poisonous to the cells. However, C. botulinum tolerates traces of oxygen due to the enzyme superoxide dismutase, which is an important antioxidant defense in nearly all cells exposed to oxygen. C. botulinum is able to produce the neurotoxin only during sporulation, which can happen only in an anaerobic environment.
C. botulinum is divided into four distinct phenotypic groups (I-IV) and is also classified into seven serotypes (A–G) based on the antigenicity of the botulinum toxin produced.

Groups 
Physiological differences and genome sequencing at 16S rRNA level support the subdivision of the C. botulinum species into groups I-IV.

One of the fundamental differences between group I and group II is that C. botulinum group I can lyse native proteins like coagulated egg white, cooked meat particles, whereas group II cannot. However, group II can ferment various carbohydrates like sucrose and mannose, and both of them can degrade the derived protein, gelatin.
Human botulism is predominantly caused by group I or II C. botulinum. Group III organisms mainly cause diseases in non-human animals. Group IV C. botulinum has not been shown to cause human or animal disease.

Botulinum toxin 

Neurotoxin production is the unifying feature of the species. Eight types of toxins have been identified that are allocated a letter (A–H), several of which can cause disease in humans. They are resistant to degradation by enzymes found in the gastrointestinal tract. This allows for ingested toxins to be absorbed from the intestines into the bloodstream.
However, all types of botulinum toxin are rapidly destroyed by heating to 100 °C for 15 minutes (900 seconds).
Botulinum toxin, one of the most poisonous biological substances known, is a neurotoxin produced by the bacterium Clostridium botulinum. C. botulinum elaborates eight antigenically distinguishable exotoxins (A, B, C1, C2, D, E, F and G).

Most strains produce one type of neurotoxin, but strains producing multiple toxins have been described. C. botulinum producing B and F toxin types have been isolated from human botulism cases in New Mexico and California. The toxin type has been designated Bf as the type B toxin was found in excess to the type F. Similarly, strains producing Ab and Af toxins have been reported.

Evidence indicates the neurotoxin genes have been the subject of horizontal gene transfer, possibly from a viral (bacteriophage) source. This theory is supported by the presence of integration sites flanking the toxin in some strains of C. botulinum. However, these integrations sites are degraded (except for the C and D types), indicating that the C. botulinum acquired the toxin genes quite far in the evolutionary past. Nevertheless, further transfers still happen via the plasmids and other mobile elements the genes are located on.

Botulinum toxin types 
Only botulinum toxin types A, B, E, F and H cause disease in humans.  Types A, B, and E  are associated with food-borne illness, while type E  is specifically associated with fish products. Type C produces limber-neck in birds and type D causes botulism in other mammals.  No disease is associated with type G.  The "gold standard" for determining toxin type is a mouse bioassay, but the genes for types A, B, E, and F can now be readily differentiated using quantitative PCR. As no antitoxin to type H is yet available, discovered in 2013 and by far the deadliest, details are kept under shroud.

A few strains from organisms genetically identified as other Clostridium species have caused human botulism: C. butyricum has produced type E toxin and C. baratii had produced type F toxin. The ability of C. botulinum to naturally transfer neurotoxin genes to other clostridia is concerning, especially in the food industry, where preservation systems are designed to destroy or inhibit only C. botulinum but not other Clostridium species.

Laboratory isolation
In the laboratory, C. botulinum is usually isolated in tryptose sulfite cycloserine (TSC) growth medium in an anaerobic environment with less than 2% oxygen. This can be achieved by several commercial kits that use a chemical reaction to replace O2 with CO2. C. botulinum is a lipase-positive microorganism that grows between pH of 4.8 and 7.0 and cannot use lactose as a primary carbon source, characteristics important for biochemical identification.

Taxonomy history

C. botulinum was first recognized and isolated in 1895 by Emile van Ermengem from home-cured ham implicated in a botulism outbreak. The isolate was originally named Bacillus botulinus, after the Latin word for sausage, botulus. ("Sausage poisoning" was a common problem in 18th- and 19th-century Germany, and was most likely caused by botulism.) However, isolates from subsequent outbreaks were always found to be anaerobic spore formers, so Ida A. Bengtson proposed that the organism be placed into the genus Clostridium, as the genus Bacillus was restricted to aerobic spore-forming rods.

Since 1959, all species producing the botulinum neurotoxins (types A–G) have been designated C. botulinum. Substantial phenotypic and genotypic evidence exists to demonstrate heterogeneity within the species. This has led to the reclassification of C. botulinum type G strains as a new species, C. argentinense.

Group I C. botulinum strains that do not produce a botulin toxin are referred to as C. sporogenes.

The complete genome of C. botulinum has been sequenced at Wellcome Trust Sanger Institute in 2007.

Pathology

Foodborne botulism
"Signs and symptoms of foodborne botulism typically begin between 18 and 36 hours after the toxin gets into your body, but can range from a few hours to several days, depending on the amount of toxin ingested."
 Double vision
 Blurred vision
 Dropping eyelids
 Nausea, vomiting, and abdominal cramps
 Slurred speech
 Trouble breathing
 Difficulty in swallowing
 Dry mouth
 Muscle weakness
 Constipation
 Reduced or absent deep tendon reactions, such as in the knee

Wound botulism
Most people who develop wound botulism inject drugs several times a day, so it is difficult to determine how long it takes for signs and symptoms to develop after the toxin enters the body. Most common in people who inject black tar heroin, wound botulism signs and symptoms include:
 Difficulty swallowing or speaking
 Facial weakness on both sides of the face
 Blurred or double vision
 Dropping eyelids
 Trouble breathing
 Paralysis

Infant botulism
If infant botulism is related to food, such as honey, problems generally begin within 18 to 36 hours after the toxin enters the baby's body. Signs and symptoms include:
 Constipation (often the first sign)
 Floppy movements due to muscle weakness and trouble controlling the head
 Weak cry
 Irritability
 Drooling
 Dropping eyelids
 Tiredness
 Difficulty sucking or feeding
 Paralysis

Beneficial effects of botulinum toxin
Purified botulinum toxin is diluted by a physician for treatment:
 Congenital pelvic tilt
 Spasmodic dysphasia (the inability of the muscles of the larynx)
 Achalasia (esophageal stricture)
 Strabismus (crossed eyes)
 Paralysis of the facial muscles
 Failure of the cervix
 Blinking frequently
 Anti-cancer drug delivery

Adult intestinal toxemia
A very rare form of botulism that occurs by the same route as infant botulism but is among adults. Occurs rarely and sporadically. Signs and symptoms include:
 Abdominal pain
 Blurred vision
 Diarrhea
 Dysarthria
 Imbalance
 Weakness in arms and hand area

C. botulinum in different geographical locations
A number of quantitative surveys for C. botulinum spores in the environment have suggested a prevalence of specific toxin types in given geographic areas, which remain unexplained.

North America
Type A C. botulinum predominates the soil samples from the western regions, while type B is the major type found in eastern areas. The type-B organisms were of the proteolytic type I. Sediments from the Great Lakes region were surveyed after outbreaks of botulism among commercially reared fish, and only type E spores were detected. In a survey, type-A strains were isolated from soils that were neutral to alkaline (average pH 7.5), while type-B strains were isolated from slightly acidic soils (average pH 6.23).

Europe
C. botulinum type E is prevalent in aquatic sediments in Norway and Sweden, Denmark, the Netherlands, the Baltic coast of Poland, and Russia. The type-E C. botulinum was suggested to be a true aquatic organism, which was indicated by the correlation between the level of type-E contamination and flooding of the land with seawater. As the land dried, the level of type E decreased and type B became dominant.

In soil and sediment from the United Kingdom, C. botulinum type B predominates. In general, the incidence is usually lower in soil than in sediment. In Italy, a survey conducted in the vicinity of Rome found a low level of contamination; all strains were proteolytic C. botulinum types A or B.

Australia
C. botulinum type A was found to be present in soil samples from mountain areas of Victoria. Type-B organisms were detected in marine mud from Tasmania. Type-A C. botulinum has been found in Sydney suburbs and types A and B were isolated from urban areas. In a well-defined area of the Darling-Downs region of Queensland, a study showed the prevalence and persistence of C. botulinum type B after many cases of botulism in horses.

Use and detection 
C. botulinum is used to prepare the medicaments Botox, Dysport, Xeomin, and Neurobloc used to selectively paralyze muscles to temporarily relieve muscle function. It has other "off-label" medical purposes, such as treating severe facial pain, such as that caused by trigeminal neuralgia.

Botulinum toxin produced by C. botulinum is often believed to be a potential bioweapon as it is so potent that it takes about 75 nanograms to kill a person ( of 1 ng/kg, assuming an average person weighs ~75 kg); 1 kilogram of it would be enough to kill the entire human population. For comparative purposes, a quarter of a typical grain of sand's weight (350 ng) of botulinum toxin would constitute a lethal dose for humans.

A "mouse protection" or "mouse bioassay" test determines the type of C. botulinum toxin present using monoclonal antibodies. An enzyme-linked immunosorbent assay (ELISA) with digoxigenin-labeled antibodies can also be used to detect the toxin, and quantitative PCR can detect the toxin genes in the organism.

Growth conditions and prevention

C. botulinum is a soil bacterium. The spores can survive in most environments and are very hard to kill. They can survive the temperature of boiling water at sea level, thus many foods are canned with a pressurized boil that achieves even higher temperatures, sufficient to kill the spores. This bacteria is widely distributed in nature and can be assumed to be present on all food surfaces. Its optimum growth temperature is within the mesophilic range. In spore form, it is a heat resistant pathogen that can survive in low acid foods and grow to produce toxins. The toxin attacks the nervous system and will kill an adult at a dose of around 75 ng. This toxin is detoxified by holding food at 100 °C for 10 minutes.

Botulism poisoning can occur due to preserved or home-canned, low-acid food that was not processed using correct preservation times and/or pressure. Growth of the bacterium can be prevented by high acidity, high ratio of dissolved sugar, high levels of oxygen, very low levels of moisture, or storage at temperatures below 3 °C (38 °F) for type A. For example, in a low-acid, canned vegetable such as green beans that are not heated enough to kill the spores (i.e., a pressurized environment) may provide an oxygen-free medium for the spores to grow and produce the toxin. However, pickles are sufficiently acidic to prevent growth; even if the spores are present, they pose no danger to the consumer.

Honey, corn syrup, and other sweeteners may contain spores, but the spores cannot grow in a highly concentrated sugar solution; however, when a sweetener is diluted in the low-oxygen, low-acid digestive system of an infant, the spores can grow and produce toxin. As soon as infants begin eating solid food, the digestive juices become too acidic for the bacterium to grow.

The control of food-borne botulism caused by C. botulinum is based almost entirely on thermal destruction (heating) of the spores or inhibiting spore germination into bacteria and allowing cells to grow and produce toxins in foods. Conditions conducive of growth are dependent on various environmental factors.
Growth of C. botulinum is a risk in low acid foods as defined by having a pH above 4.6 although growth is significantly retarded for pH below 4.9.

In the beginning of 21st century there have been some cases and specific conditions reported to sustain growth with pH below 4.6. but at higher temperature.

Diagnosis 
Physicians may consider the diagnosis of botulism based on a patient's clinical presentation, which classically includes an acute onset of bilateral cranial neuropathies and symmetric descending weakness. Other key features of botulism include an absence of fever, symmetric neurologic deficits, normal or slow heart rate and normal blood pressure, and no sensory deficits except for blurred vision. A careful history and physical examination is paramount in order to diagnose the type of botulism, as well as to rule out other conditions with similar findings, such as Guillain–Barré syndrome, stroke, and myasthenia gravis. Depending on the type of botulism considered, different tests for diagnosis may be indicated.
 Foodborne botulism: serum analysis for toxins by bioassay in mice should be done, as the demonstration of the toxins is diagnostic.
 Wound botulism: isolation of C. botulinum from the wound site should be attempted, as growth of the bacteria is diagnostic.
 Adult enteric and infant botulism: isolation and growth of C. botulinum from stool samples is diagnostic. Infant botulism is a diagnosis which is often missed in the emergency room.

Other tests that may be helpful in ruling out other conditions are:
 Electromyography (EMG) or antibody studies may help with the exclusion of myasthenia gravis and Lambert–Eaton myasthenic syndrome (LEMS).
 Collection of cerebrospinal fluid (CSF) protein and blood assist with the exclusion of Guillan-Barre syndrome and stroke.
 Detailed physical examination of the patient for any rash or tick presence helps with the exclusion of any tick transmitted tick paralysis.

Treatment 
In the case of a diagnosis or suspicion of botulism, patients should be hospitalized immediately, even if the diagnosis and/or tests are pending. If botulism is suspected, patients should be treated immediately with antitoxin therapy in order to reduce mortality. Immediate intubation is also highly recommended, as respiratory failure is the primary cause of death from botulism.

In Canada, there are currently only three antitoxin therapies available, which are accessible through Health Canada Special Access Program (SAP). The three types of antitoxin therapies are: 1) GlaxoSmithKline trivalent Types ABE, 2) NP-018 (heptavalent) Types A to G, and 3) BabyBIG, Botulism Immune Globulin Intravenous (Human) (BIG-IV) for pediatric patients under the age of one year.

Outcomes vary between one and three months, but with prompt interventions, mortality from botulism ranges from less than 5 percent to 8 percent.

Vaccination 
There used to be a formalin-treated toxoid vaccine against botulism (serotypes A-E), but it was discontinued in 2011 due to declining potency in the toxoid stock. It was originally intended for people at risk of exposure. A few new vaccines are under development.

References

External links 
 

Bacteria described in 1896
Botulism
botulinum
Food microbiology
Gram-positive bacteria